The 1997 European Junior Canoe Slalom Championships  were the 2nd edition of the European Junior Canoe Slalom Championships. The event took place in Nowy Sącz, Poland from 29 to 31 August 1997 under the auspices of the European Canoe Association (ECA). A total of 7 medal events took place. No medals were awarded for the men's C2 team event due to low number of participating countries.

Medal summary

Men

Canoe

Kayak

Women

Kayak

Medal table

References

External links
European Canoe Association

European Junior and U23 Canoe Slalom Championships
European Junior and U23 Canoe Slalom Championships